Guadalcanal (indigenous name: Isatabu) is the principal island in Guadalcanal Province of Solomon Islands, located in the south-western Pacific, northeast of Australia. It is the largest island in the Solomon Islands by area, and the second by population (after Malaita). The island is mainly covered in dense tropical rainforest and has a mountainous hinterland.
 

Guadalcanal was first charted by westerners during the Spanish expedition of Álvaro de Mendaña in 1568. The name comes from the village of Guadalcanal, in the province of Seville, in Andalusia, Spain, birthplace of Pedro de Ortega Valencia, a member of Mendaña's expedition.

During 1942 and 1943, it was the scene of the Guadalcanal Campaign and saw bitter fighting between Japanese and US troops. The Americans were ultimately victorious. At the end of World War II, Honiara, on the north coast of Guadalcanal, became the new capital of the British Solomon Islands Protectorate.

Geography

Topography
List of peaks in Guadalcanal by elevation

Mount Popomanaseu – 
Mount Makarakomburu – 
Mount Tanareirei – 
Mount Namolava – 
Makaratanggoe – 
Mount Latinarau – 
Mount Kaichui – 
Mount Vatuchichi – 
Mount Tambunanguu – 
Mount Tohasa – 
Mount Pinau – 
Mount Nasuha – 
Mount Tatuve – 
Mount Ngalighombe – 
Mount Vatupochau – 
Mount Kemau – 
Mount Vatunjae – 
Mount Chaunapaho – 
Mount Tingge Tingge – 
Chupu Tambu – 
Mount Hanihanikaro – 
Mount Vatu Horoi – 
Lumulumuchichi – 
Mount Lambuhila – 
Mount Manuchuma – 
Mount Vatutora – 
Mount Rauramba – 
Mount Vausu – 
Mount Vuro – 
Mount Taluva – 
Mount Gallego – 
Mount Popori – 
Mount Valivalisi – 
Mount Na Vatu – 
Mount Tughuruloki – 
Mount Mbelapoke – 
Mount Vungana – 
Mount Esperance –

River System
List of longest rivers by length

Mbokokimbo River –  
Lungga River – 
Mbalisuna River – 
Mberande River – 
Mongga River – 
Itina River – 
Aola River – 
Simiu River – 
Rere River – 
Kombito River – 
Matanikau River – 
Koloula River –

History

Prehistory
The island has been settled since at least 4500–2500 BC based on archaeological finds at Poha Cave and Vatuluma Posovi. During the period 1200-800 BC Austronesian Lapita peoples settled the islands.

Western charting
A Spanish expedition from Peru in 1568 under the command of Álvaro de Mendaña de Neira were the first Europeans to see the island. Mendaña's subordinate, Pedro de Ortega Valencia, named the island after his home town Guadalcanal in Andalusia, Spain. In the years that followed the discovery, the island was variously referred to as Guadarcana, Guarcana, Guadalcana, and Guadalcanar, which reflected different pronunciations of its name in Andalusian Spanish.

Colonial period 
European settlers, whalers, and missionaries began to arrive in the 18th and 19th centuries. With these outsiders also arrived foreign institutions like forced labour. Beginning during the 1860s, about 60,000 natives from many parts of the Solomon Islands were indentured and sent to Australia or Fiji by British authorities to work on plantations. This system continued into the 1890s. In the 1880s, the Germans and the British vied for control of the Solomons. Germany established a protectorate over the northern Solomons in 1884 while in 1893, the British Solomon Islands Protectorate was proclaimed which included the island of Guadalcanal. However, Germany eventually handed over most of their protectorate to Britain in 1899. By the early 20th century, large agricultural plantations (specialising in copra) run mainly by Australians were established in the region. Guadalcanal was not seriously affected by World War I. In 1932, the British confirmed the name Guadalcanal in line with the town in Andalusia, Spain.

Second World War 

In the months following the attack on Pearl Harbor in December 1941, the Japanese drove the Americans out of the Philippines, the British out of British Malaya, and the Dutch out of the East Indies. The Japanese then began to expand into the Western Pacific, occupying many islands in an attempt to build a defensive ring around their conquests and threaten the lines of communication from the United States to Australia and New Zealand. The Japanese reached Guadalcanal in May 1942.

When an American reconnaissance mission spotted construction of a Japanese airfield at Lunga Point on the north coast of Guadalcanal, the situation became critical. This new Japanese airfield represented a threat to Australia itself, and so the United States as a matter of urgency, despite not being adequately prepared, conducted its first amphibious landing of the war. The initial landings of the 1st Marine Division on 7 August 1942 secured the airfield without too much difficulty, but holding the airfield for the next six months was one of the most hotly contested campaigns in the entire war for the control of ground, sea and skies.

Immediately after landing on the island, the US Navy Seabees began finishing the airfield begun by the Japanese. It was then named Henderson Field after a Marine aviator killed in combat during the Battle of Midway. Aircraft operating from Henderson Field during the campaign were a hodgepodge of Marine, Army, Navy and allied aircraft that became known as the Cactus Air Force. They defended the airfield and threatened any Japanese ships that ventured into the vicinity during daylight hours. However, at night, Japanese naval forces were able to shell the airfield and deliver troops with supplies, retiring before daylight. The Japanese used fast ships to make these runs, and this became known as the Tokyo Express. So many ships from both sides were sunk in the many engagements in and around the Solomon Island chain that the nearby waters were referred to as Ironbottom Sound.

The Battle of Cape Esperance was fought on 11 October 1942 off the northwest coast of Guadalcanal. In the battle, United States Navy ships intercepted and defeated a Japanese formation of ships on their way down 'the Slot' to reinforce and resupply troops on the island, but suffered losses as well. The Naval Battle of Guadalcanal in November marked the turning point in which Allied Naval forces took on the extremely experienced Japanese surface forces at night and forced them to withdraw after sharp action. Some Japanese viewpoints consider these engagements, and the improving Allied surface capability to challenge their surface ships at night, to be just as significant as the Battle of Midway in turning the tide against them.

After six months of hard combat in and around Guadalcanal and dealing with jungle diseases that took a heavy toll of troops on both sides, Allied forces had brought the Japanese advance to a halt. Guadalcanal was a major turning point in the war as it stopped further Japanese expansion. Remaining Japanese forces evacuated the island at Cape Esperance on the northwest coast in February 1943. American authorities declared Guadalcanal secure on 9 February 1943.

Two US Navy ships have been named for the battle:
USS Guadalcanal (CVE-60), a World War II escort carrier.
USS Guadalcanal (LPH-7), an amphibious assault ship.

To date, the only Coast Guardsman recipient of the Medal of Honor is Signalman 1st Class Douglas Albert Munro, awarded posthumously for his extraordinary heroism on 27 September 1942 at Point Cruz, Guadalcanal. Munro provided a shield and covering fire, and helped evacuate 500 besieged Marines from a beach at Point Cruz; he was killed during the evacuation.

During the Battle for Guadalcanal, the Medal of Honor was also awarded to John Basilone who later died on Iwo Jima.

After the war, American and Japanese groups have repeatedly visited Guadalcanal to search for remains of missing soldiers. Some 7,000 Japanese remain missing on the island, and islanders still bring the Japanese groups bones that the islanders say are those of unearthed Japanese soldiers.

Post-war years
Immediately after the Second World War, the capital of the British Solomon Islands Protectorate was moved to Honiara on Guadalcanal from its previous location at Tulagi in the Florida Islands. In 1952 the High Commissioner for the Western Pacific moved from Fiji to Honiara and the post was combined with that of the Governor of the Solomon Islands. The airfield which was the cause of the fighting in 1942, and which became well known as Henderson Field is now the international airport for the Solomon Islands. It sits about five miles to the east of Honiara.
The secondary airfield, known as "Fighter Two" is now the local golf course.

Civil war 

In early 1999, long-simmering tensions between the local Guale people on Guadalcanal and more recent migrants from the neighbouring island of Malaita erupted into violence. The Guadalcanal Revolutionary Army, later called Isatabu Freedom Movement (IFM), began terrorising Malaitans in the rural areas of the island in an effort to force them out of their homes. About 20,000 Malaitans fled to the capital and others returned to their home island; Guale residents of Honiara fled. The city became a Malaitan enclave and the Malaita Eagle Force took over government. The Royal Australian Navy and Royal New Zealand Navy deployed vessels to the area to protect the expatriate community resident mostly in Honiara. On her second visit to the capital, the frigate  served as venue for a series of peace talks culminating in the signing of the Townsville Peace Accord.

In 2003, the Pacific Forum negotiated the intervention of RAMSI or Operation Helpem Fren involving Australia, New Zealand, and other Pacific Island Nations.

Vilu War Museum

About 25 km (15 miles) from Honiara to the West, Vilu War Museum houses an outdoor collection of remains of various parts of military equipment and of several aircraft. Several memorials for the American, Australian, Fijian, New Zealand and Japanese soldiers who lost their lives were erected as well.

Fauna
The island hosts a native marsupial known as the phalanger or grey cuscus, Phalanger orientalis. The only other mammals are bats and rodents.

There are many species of colourful parrots as well as estuarine crocodiles. In recent times, these crocodiles have been found only on the Weather Coast in the south of the island, but during the Second World War, they were found along the north coast in the vicinity of the airstrip where the fighting was taking place, as evidenced by names such as Alligator Creek.

Venomous snakes are rare on the island and are not considered to be a serious threat; however, there is a kind of centipede that has a particularly nasty bite. These centipedes were well known to the American Marines during the Second World War as "the stinging insects".

Important Bird Area
The Guadalcanal Watersheds form a site that has been identified by BirdLife International as an Important Bird Area (IBA) because it supports populations of threatened or endemic bird species. At 376,146 ha (1452 sq. mi.), it covers some 70% of the island, extending along the southern coast inland to the central highlands, it contains riverine and lowland tropical rainforest as well as the greatest contiguous area of cloud forest in the Solomons. Although it also contains gardens and old village sites, most of it has never been permanently inhabited. Significant birds for which the site was identified include chestnut-bellied imperial pigeons, Woodford's rails, Guadalcanal moustached kingfishers, Meek's lorikeets, Guadalcanal honeyeaters, Guadalcanal thicketbirds and Guadalcanal thrushes. Potential threats to the site include logging and invasive species.

In fiction 
The short story The Red One by Jack London is set on Guadalcanal. It was published in 1918, 2 years after his death.

See also 
Guadalcanal Diary, 1943 book by Richard Tregaskis
Guadalcanal Diary, 1943 film based on the book
James R. "Rube" Garrett A Marine Diary: My Experiences on Guadalcanal

References

Bibliography 
Frank, Richard B. Guadalcanal: The Definitive Account of the Landmark Battle, Penguin Books, 1990.
Hadden, Robert Lee. 2007. "The Geology of Guadalcanal: a Selected Bibliography of the Geology, Natural History, and the History of Guadalcanal." by Robert Lee Hadden. Alexandria, VA: Topographic Engineering Center.

External links

Guadalcanal Odyssey (1975)

 
Islands of the Solomon Islands
Important Bird Areas of the Solomon Islands
World War II sites in the Solomon Islands